Brown is a popular English-language surname derived from the color brown as a personal feature. This list provides links to biography of people who share this surname, organized by area of endeavor.

Activism
Eva Maria Brown (1856-1917), American social reformer, temperance activist
H. Rap Brown (born 1943), American civil rights activist
Hallie Quinn Brown (1849–1949), African-American educator, writer, activist
Hazel Brown (1942–2022), Trinbagonian women's and consumer rights activist
Lyn Mikel Brown (born 1956), American academic, author, feminist, and youth activist
Olympia Brown (1835–1926), American women's suffragist
John Brown of Priesthill (1627–1685), Presbyterian Martyr

Art and architecture
Christy Brown (1932–1981), Irish author, painter and poet
Dexter Brown (born 1942), British painter 
Ethel Isadore Brown (1872–1944), American painter
Ford Madox Brown (1821–1893), English painter
Georgia Louise Harris Brown (1918–1999), American architect
 Gordon H. Brown (born 1931), New Zealand art historian, curator, and artist
James MacLellan Brown (c. 1886–1967), city architect of Dundee,
Joan Brown (artist, born 1945), American artist
Lancelot "Capability" Brown (1716–1783), English landscape gardener
Laurie Halsey Brown, American artist
Neave Brown (1929–2018), American-born British architect
Nyuju Stumpy Brown (1924–2011), Australian painter
Thomas Brown (1781–1850), Scots architect
Thomas Brown (1806–1872), Scots architect notable for prison design

Business
Bobbi Brown (born 1957), makeup artist and entrepreneur
Jim Brown (banker), New Zealand banker

Crime
Brenda Sue Brown (1955–1966), American murder victim
Kenyel Brown (1979–2020), American criminal
Michael Brown (born 1966), Scots fraudster
Nathaniel Bar-Jonah (1957–2008), born David Paul Brown, convicted kidnapper and child sexual assaulter
Nixzmary Brown (1998–2006), American murder victim from Brooklyn, New York
 Mr Brown, the code name used by Peter Macari during his extortion of 500,000 dollars from Qantas in March 197*Royale Brown (2009–2022), FilmMaker

Engineering, science, and medicine
Barnum Brown (1873–1963), American paleontologist
Charlotte Blake Brown (1846–1904), pioneering American doctor
Edgar H. Brown (1926–2021), American mathematician
Gerald E. Brown (1926–2013), American theoretical physicist
G. Spencer-Brown (1923–2016), English mathematician
James Campbell Brown (1843–1910), British chemist
Jeannette Brown (born 1934), American organic medicinal chemist, historian, and author
Lowell S. Brown (born 1934), American physicist
N. E. Brown (Nicholas Edward Brown, 1849–1934), botanist
Roland W. Brown (1893–1961), American paleobotanist
William C. Brown (1916 – 1999), American electrical engineer

Fiction
 Amber Brown, title character in a series of books by Paula Danziger
 Bingo Brown, title character in a series of books by Betsy Byars
Buster Brown, an early 20th-century U.S. comic strip character
Charlie Brown, central hero of the Peanuts cartoon by Charles Schulz
Cleveland Brown, character on the television shows Family Guy and The Cleveland Show
 Dr Emmett Brown, the "crazy, wild-eyed" scientist from the Back to the Future trilogy, played by Christopher Lloyd
Encyclopedia Brown, boy detective
Father Brown, Catholic priest and detective in stories by G. K. Chesterton
Lavender Brown, fellow student in the Harry Potter series by J. K. Rowling
Paddington Brown, bear in Michael Bond's children's stories
 Rembrandt Brown, musician in US TV show Sliders
Sally Brown, sister of Charlie Brown in Peanuts cartoon by Charles Schulz
Teela Brown, heroine of Larry Niven's Ringworld SF series with in-born good luck
 Vanbeest Brown, pseudonym of Harry Bertram in Sir Walter Scott's novel, Guy Mannering
Agent Brown in The Matrix
 Mr Brown/Jeremy Brown, the English teacher in the British show Mind your Language. He is played by Barry Evans (actor)

Film, television, and theater
A. Whitney Brown (born 1952), American comedian
 Ajiona Alexus Brown (born 1996), American actress better known as Ajiona Alexus
 Alden Brown, birth name of Peter North (born 1957), Canadian-born pornographic actor
Alton Brown (born 1962), American TV chef
Bille Brown (1952–2013), Australian actor and playwright
Blair Brown  (born 1946), actress
 Blake Ellender Brown, birth name of Blake Lively (born 1987), American actress
Bryan Brown (born 1947), Australian actor
Candy Brown (born 1958), American actress and dancer
Clancy Brown (born 1959), American actor
Clarence Brown (1890–1987), American movie director
Joe E. Brown (1891–1973), British/American actor and comedian
June Brown (1927–2022), English actress
Kardea Brown, American chef and television host
Millie Bobby Brown (born 2004), English actress and model
Quinne Brown (born 1979), South African actress
Samantha Brown (born 1970), Travel Channel host
Theo Wade Brown (1950–2002), British designer and eccentric, well-known member of the London special effects community
Treg Brown (1899–1984), sound-effects editor for Warner Bros. Cartoons
Yvette Nicole Brown (born 1971), American actress

History, philosophy, and religion
Archie Brown (historian) (born 1938), British academic and historian
Truesdell Sparhawk Brown (1906–1992), American historian of ancient Greece

Literature
Anna Brown (1747–1810), ballad collector
Dale Brown (born 1956), American novelist
Emma Elizabeth Brown (1847–1???), American writer, artist
Fredric Brown (1906–1972), science fiction and mystery author
Harriet Connor Brown (1872-1962), American writer and women's rights activist
Hilary Brown (born 1946), Canadian journalist
J. B. Selkirk (James Brown of Selkirk, 1832–1904), Scottish poet and essayist
Lillian Brown (1914–2020), American writer, radio and television producer, educator, and make-up artist 
Norman O. Brown (1913–2002), American literary scholar
Phoebe Hinsdale Brown (1783–1861), American hymnwriter
Rita Mae Brown (born 1944), American writer and social activist
 Rollo Walter Brown (1880-1956), American writer and teacher of rhetoric
Roseanne A. Brown, Ghanaian American writer 
Rosel George Brown (1926–1967), American science fiction author
Ticasuk Brown (1904–1982), Iñupiaq educator poet and writer
Tina Brown (born 1953), English journalist and author, biographer of Diana, Princess of Wales

Music
Angie Brown (born 1963), British singer
Ayla Brown (born 1988), American singer, college basketball player and former American Idol contestant
Chastity Brown (born 1982), American singer-songwriter
Chuck Brown (1936–2012), American guitarist, singer and songwriter
Clifford Brown (1930–1956), American jazz trumpeter
Dennis Brown (1957–1999), Jamaican reggae singer
Dusty Brown (1929–2016), American blues harmonicist, singer and songwriter
Earle Brown (1926–2002), American experimental composer
Eban Brown (born 1972), American pop vocalist, lead singer of The Stylistics
Gabriel Brown (1910–1972), American Piedmont blues singer and guitarist
Gertrude Foster Brown (1867–1956), concert pianist, teacher, suffragette
Iona Brown (1941–2004), British violinist and conductor
Ivadell Brown, American musician and vocalist
J. Harold Brown (died 1982), American composer
James Brown (1933–2006), American vocalist, musician, and composer
Jazbo Brown, black Delta blues musician from around the turn of the 20th century, whose existence is disputed
Jocelyn Brown (born 1950), American R&B and dance music singer
Julie Brown (born 1958), American actress and singer
Junior Brown (born 1952), American country singer
Kane Brown (born 1993), American country music singer and songwriter
Kevin Brown (blues musician) (born 1950), English blues guitarist, songwriter and singer
 Khalif Brown (born 1995), birth name of Swae Lee, American rapper
Kitty Brown (1899–after 1990), American classic female blues singer
Lew Brown (1893–1958), American lyricist
Marion Vree-Brown (1920-2012), American composer
Melanie Brown (born 1975), English pop singer
Odell Brown (1940–2011), American jazz organist
Pearly Brown (aka Reverend, or Blind, Pearly Brown; 1915–1986), American musician
Ruth Brown (1928–2006), American singer
Texas Johnny Brown (1928–2013), American blues guitarist, songwriter and singer
Trisha Brown (1936–2017), American choreographer and dancer
 Tyler Jamal Brown (born 1995), birth name of American rapper and singer Tyla Yaweh
Vicki Brown (1940–1991), English singer
Wilfred Brown (tenor) (1921–1971), English tenor
The Browns, American country and folk music vocal trio
Bonnie Brown (musician) (1938–2016)
Jim Ed Brown (1934–2015)
Maxine Brown (country singer) (1931–2019)
The 5 Browns, classical piano musical group: Ryan, Melody, Gregory, Deondra, and Desirae

Politics

Disambiguation
Mayor Brown (disambiguation)
Representative Brown (disambiguation)
Senator Brown (disambiguation)

Australia
Peter Broun (1797–1846), known for most of life as Peter Nicholas Brown, first Colonial Secretary of Western Australia (1829–1846)

Canada
Fergy Brown (1923–2013), Canadian politician

New Zealand
Len Brown (born 1956), controversial Auckland mayor

United Kingdom 

 George Brown (1914–1985), British Labour party politician

United States
A. Freeborn Brown (1915–1998), Maryland state delegate and lawyer
Adam M. Brown (1826–1910), mayor of Pittsburgh, Pennsylvania in 1901
Adon P. Brown (1873–1942), New York state senator
Basil W. Brown (1927–1997), Michigan state senator
Byron D. Brown (1854–1929), New York state assemblyman
Clarke W. Brown (died 1956), Michigan Secretary of State
Cloria Brown (1942–2018), Missouri state representative
Corrine Brown (born 1946), Florida Representative from 1993 to 2017 and convicted felon
Edward and Elaine Brown  (born 1942 and c. 1940), New Hampshire tax protesters
Elon R. Brown (1857–1922), President pro tem of the New York State Senate 1915 until 1918
Emily Sophie Brown (1881–1985), one of the first women elected to the Connecticut House of Representatives 
Fred H. Brown (1879–1955), American lawyer and politician
Garfield W. Brown (1881-1967), American lawyer and Minnesota state representative
Hank Brown (born 1940), United States Senator from Colorado 1991 to 1997, and five-term U.S. Representative of Colorado's 4th congressional district from 1981 to 1991
J. Marshall Brown (1926–1995), Louisiana state representative and Democratic national committeeman
Neal Brown (Wisconsin politician) (1861–1917), American politician
Pat Brown (1905–1996), governor of California from 1959 to 1967
Raleigh Brown (1921–2009), Texas House of Representatives and state judge
Ron Brown (1941–1996), Secretary of Commerce, Chairman of the Democratic National Committee
Sherrod Brown (born 1952), U.S. senator from Ohio
Vanessa L. Brown (born 1966), Democratic member of the Pennsylvania House of Representatives who was convicted of bribery

Sports
A. J. Brown (born 1997), American football player
Akeem Ennis-Brown (born 1995), English boxer
Alfredo Brown (1886–1958), Argentine association football player
Ali Brown (born 1970), English cricketer
Allen Brown (1943–2020), American football player
Alyssa Brown (born 1989), Canadian artistic gymnast
Antonio Brown (born 1988), American football player
Antonio Brown (wide receiver, born 1978), American football player
Arkeith Brown (born 1986), American football player
Ashley Brown (soccer) (born 1994), Australian footballer
Barrie Brown (1931–2014), Australian rules footballer
Beniquez Brown (born 1993), American football player
Blace Brown (born 1996), American football player
Blair Brown (American football) (born 1994), American football player
Brant Brown (born 1971), American baseball player and coach
Brittain Brown (born 1997), American football player
Carlon Brown, American basketball player
Chase Brown (born 2000), Canadian American football player
Cyril Brown (1918–1990), English footballer
Dante Brown (born 1980), American football player
Darby Brown (1929–1988), Australian boxer of the 1940s, and 1950s
Deonte Brown (born 1998), American football player
Diane Brown (curling) (born 1946), American curler and coach
Donatello Brown (born 1991), American football player
Dougie Brown (born 1969), Scottish cricketer
Dyami Brown (born 1999), American football player
Earnest Brown IV (born 1999), American football player
Edwin Brown (1898–1972), Australian rugby league footballer
Eliseo Brown (1888 – after 1911), Argentine association football player
Erika Brown (curler) (born 1973), American curler
Ernesto Brown (1885–1935), Argentine association football player
Fa'amanu Brown (born 1994), New Zealand rugby league player
Fadol Brown (born 1993), American football player
Frankie Brown (born 1987), Scottish association footballer
Gabe Brown (born 2000), American basketball player
Gates Brown (1939–2013), American baseball player
Gene Brown (basketball) (1935–2020), American basketball player
Gilbert Brown (born 1971), American NFL football defensive tackle for the Green Bay Packers
Greg Brown (baseball coach) (born 1980), American baseball coach
Herb Brown (born 1936), American basketball coach
Hunter Brown (baseball) (born 1998), American baseball player
Ike Brown (1942–2001), American baseball player
Ira Brown (born 1982), Japanese basketball player
J'Covan Brown (born 1990), American basketball player in the Israel Basketball Premier League
Jammal Brown (born 1981), American NFL football left tackle for the New Orleans Saints
Jared Brown (born 1973), American football player
Jason Brown (baseball) (born 1974), American baseball coach
Jason Brown (figure skater) (born 1994), American figure skater
Jayon Brown (born 1995), American football player
Jim Brown (born 1936), American NFL football player, Cleveland Browns
Jophery Brown (1945–2014), American baseball player
Jorge Brown (1880–1936), Argentine association football player
José Luis Brown (1956–2019), Argentine association football player
Journey Brown (born 1999), American football player
Juan Domingo Brown (1888–1931), Argentine association football player
Kendall Brown (basketball) (born 2003), American basketball player
Kerrith Brown (born 1962), British judoka
Kiel Brown (born 1984), Australian field hockey midfielder
Kris Brown (born 1976), American football placekicker
Kwame Brown (born 1982), American basketball player
Kyron Brown (born 1996), American football player
Leddie Brown (born 2000), American football player
Lorenzo Brown (born 1990), basketball player in the Israeli Basketball Premier League
Mace Brown (1909–2002), American baseball player
Markel Brown (born 1992), American basketball player
Marquise Brown (born 1997), American football player
Miles Brown (American football) (born 1997), American football player
Montaric Brown (born 1999), American football player
Monty Brown (born 1970), American professional wrestler
Mordecai Brown (1876–1948), American baseball player
Neal Brown (born 1980), American football coach
R. M. Brown (1885–1927), American college sports coach
R. R. Brown (1879–1950), American athlete
Rod Brown (born 1978), American basketball player
Rod Brown (gridiron football) (born 1963), American football player
Ronnie Brown (born 1981), American football player
Ruben Brown (born 1972), American football player
Sailor Brown (1915–2008), English footballer
Sean Brown (born 1976), professional ice hockey player
Seth Brown (baseball) (born 1992), American baseball player
Shannon Brown (born 1985), American basketball player
Shakur Brown (born 1999), American football player
Sherwood Brown (born 1991), American basketball player
Sky Brown (born 2009), Anglo-Japanese skateboarder
Stevens Brown (1875–1957), English cricketer
Stuart Brown (born 1972), British sidecarcross rider
Sydney Brown (American football) (born 2000), Canadian American football player
Tevin Brown (born 1998), American basketball player
Tre Brown (born 1997), American football player
Wes Brown (born 1979), English footballer

Other fields
Claudine K. Brown (1949–2016), museum director
Derren Brown (born 1971), English magician and psychological illusionist
George Brown (1650–1730), arithmetician and inventor
Heidi V. Brown, United States Army Major General
John Coggin Brown (1884–1962), British geologist
Jill E. Brown (born 1950), African American aviator
Kirsty M. Brown, served as the Chairman of the World Adult Resources Committee
Louis M. Brown (1909–1996), US lawyer and pioneer of preventive law
Louise Brown (born 1978), the first "test-tube baby"
Marian and Vivian Brown (1927–2013/14), notable San Francisco twins
mrbrown, a prominent Singaporean blogger
Violet Brown (1900–2017), oldest verified person in Jamaica
Walter Brown (1886–1957), engineer and mathematician
TBJZL (born 1993), English YouTuber

Disambiguation pages
Aaron Brown (disambiguation)
Abe Brown (disambiguation)
Adam Brown (disambiguation)
Adrian Brown (disambiguation)
Al Brown (disambiguation)
Alan Brown (disambiguation)
Albert Brown (disambiguation)
Alex Brown (disambiguation)
Alexander Brown (disambiguation)
Alfred Brown (disambiguation)
Alice Brown (disambiguation)
Alistair Brown (disambiguation)
Allan Brown (disambiguation)
Amanda Brown (disambiguation)
Andre Brown (disambiguation)
Andrew Brown (disambiguation)
Andy Brown (disambiguation)
Anne Brown (disambiguation)
Anthony Brown (disambiguation)
Arnold Brown (disambiguation)
Arthur Brown (disambiguation)
Barbara Brown (disambiguation)
Barry Brown (disambiguation)
Ben Brown (disambiguation)
Benjamin Brown (disambiguation)
Bert Brown (disambiguation)
Bertram Brown (disambiguation)
Bill Brown (disambiguation)
Billy Brown (disambiguation)
Bob Brown (disambiguation)
Bobby Brown (disambiguation)
Bonnie Brown (disambiguation)
Brian Brown (disambiguation)
Bruce Brown (disambiguation)
Bud Brown (disambiguation)
Buster Brown (disambiguation)
Cameron Brown (disambiguation)
Carl Brown (disambiguation)
Carlos Brown (disambiguation)
Carol Brown (disambiguation)
Carolyn Brown (disambiguation)
Catherine Brown (disambiguation)
Cecil Brown (disambiguation)
Chad Brown (disambiguation)
Charles Brown (disambiguation)
Charlotte Brown (disambiguation)
Chris Brown (disambiguation)
Cindy Brown (disambiguation)
Clarence Brown (disambiguation)
Cliff Brown (disambiguation)
Clive Brown (disambiguation)
Colin Brown (disambiguation)
Connor Brown (disambiguation)
Courtney Brown (disambiguation)
Craig Brown (disambiguation)
Curtis Brown (disambiguation)
Dana Brown (disambiguation)
Daniel Brown (disambiguation)
Darrell Brown (disambiguation)
David Brown (disambiguation)
Dean Brown (disambiguation)
Dee Brown (disambiguation)
Dennis Brown (disambiguation)
Derek Brown (disambiguation)
Derrick Brown (disambiguation)
Dick Brown (disambiguation)
Donald Brown (disambiguation)
Donna Brown (disambiguation)
Dorothy Brown (disambiguation)
Doug Brown (disambiguation)
Dustin Brown (disambiguation)
Earl Brown (disambiguation)
Eddie Brown (disambiguation)
Edgar Brown (disambiguation)
Edith Brown (disambiguation)
Edmund Brown (disambiguation)
Edward Brown (disambiguation)
Elizabeth Brown (disambiguation)
Elliot Brown (disambiguation)
Eric Brown (disambiguation)
Ernest Brown (disambiguation)
Errol Brown (disambiguation)
Eugene Brown (disambiguation)
Evan Brown (disambiguation)
Foxy Brown (disambiguation)
Frances Brown (disambiguation)
Francis Brown (disambiguation)
Frank Brown (disambiguation)
Fred Brown (disambiguation)
Garry Brown (disambiguation)
Gary Brown (disambiguation)
Gavin Brown (disambiguation)
Gene Brown (disambiguation)
Geoffrey Brown (disambiguation)
George Brown (disambiguation)
George Washington Brown (disambiguation)
Georgia Brown (disambiguation)
Gerald Brown (disambiguation)
Gerry Brown (disambiguation)
Gillian Brown (disambiguation)
Glenn Brown (disambiguation)
Godfrey Brown (disambiguation)
Gordon Brown (disambiguation)
Grace Brown (disambiguation)
Greg Brown (disambiguation)
Gus Brown (disambiguation)
Harold Brown (disambiguation)
Harrison Brown (disambiguation)
Harry Brown (disambiguation)
Harvey Brown (disambiguation)
Helen Brown (disambiguation)
Henry Brown (disambiguation)
Herbert Brown (disambiguation)
Horace Brown (disambiguation)
Howard Brown (disambiguation)
Hubert Brown (disambiguation)
Hugh Brown (disambiguation)
Ian Brown (disambiguation)
Ivor Brown (disambiguation)
J. T. Brown (disambiguation)
Jack Brown (disambiguation)
Jackie Brown (disambiguation)
Jacob Brown (disambiguation)
Jake Brown (disambiguation)
James Brown (disambiguation)
Jamie Brown (disambiguation)
Jason Brown (disambiguation)
Jeff Brown (disambiguation)
Jeffrey Brown (disambiguation)
Jeremiah Brown (disambiguation)
Jeremy Brown (disambiguation)
Jermaine Brown (disambiguation)
Jerry Brown (disambiguation)
Jesse Brown (disambiguation)
Jim Brown (disambiguation)
Joe Brown (disambiguation)
John Brown (disambiguation)
John Henry Brown (disambiguation)
John Robert Brown (disambiguation)
John Young Brown (disambiguation)
John Brown Jr. (disambiguation)
Jonathan Brown (disambiguation)
Jordan Brown (disambiguation)
Joseph Brown (disambiguation)
Josh Brown (disambiguation)
Joyce Brown (disambiguation)
Judith Brown (disambiguation)
Julie Brown (disambiguation)
Justin Brown (disambiguation)
Karen Brown (disambiguation)
Karl Brown (disambiguation)
Kate Brown (disambiguation)—also covering Katharine, Katie, Kathy, Kathleen, and similar
Keith Brown (disambiguation)
Kelly Brown (disambiguation)
Ken Brown (disambiguation)
Kenneth Brown (disambiguation)
Kent Brown (disambiguation)
Kerry Brown (disambiguation)
Kevin Brown (disambiguation)
Kim Brown (disambiguation)
Kyle Brown (disambiguation)
Larry Brown (disambiguation)
Laurie Brown (disambiguation)
Lawrence Brown (disambiguation)
Lee Brown (disambiguation)
Leon Brown (disambiguation)
Leroy Brown (disambiguation)
Les Brown (disambiguation)
Leslie Brown (disambiguation)
Levi Brown (disambiguation)
Lewis Brown (disambiguation)
Lisa Brown (disambiguation)
Lloyd Brown (disambiguation)
Louise Brown (disambiguation)
Lucy Brown (disambiguation)
Lyn Brown (disambiguation)
Malcolm Brown (disambiguation)
Marc Brown (disambiguation)
Marcus Brown (disambiguation)
Margaret Brown (disambiguation)
Marilyn Brown (disambiguation)
Mark Brown (disambiguation)
Martha Brown (disambiguation)
Martin Brown (disambiguation)
Marty Brown (disambiguation)
Mary Brown (disambiguation)
Matt Brown (disambiguation)
Max Brown (disambiguation)
Maxine Brown (disambiguation)
Maxwell Brown (disambiguation)
Mel Brown (disambiguation)
Melissa Brown (disambiguation)
Melville Brown (disambiguation)
Melvin Brown (disambiguation)
Michael Brown (disambiguation)
Mick Brown (disambiguation)
Mitch Brown (disambiguation)
Moses Brown (disambiguation)
Nancy Brown (disambiguation)
Natalie Brown (disambiguation)
Nathan Brown (disambiguation)
Neil Brown (disambiguation)
Nicholas Brown (disambiguation)
Noah Brown (disambiguation)
Norman Brown (disambiguation)
Oliver Brown (disambiguation)
Omar Brown (disambiguation)
Orlando Brown (disambiguation)
Owen Brown (disambiguation)
Pamela Brown (disambiguation)
Pat Brown (disambiguation)
Patrick Brown (disambiguation)
Paul Brown (disambiguation)
Percy Brown (disambiguation)
Peter Brown (disambiguation)
Phil Brown (disambiguation)
Philip Brown (disambiguation)
Preston Brown (disambiguation)
Rachel Brown (disambiguation)
Ralph Brown (disambiguation)
Randy Brown (disambiguation)
Raymond Brown (disambiguation)
Rebecca Brown (disambiguation)
Reggie Brown (disambiguation)
Representative Brown (disambiguation)
Ricardo Brown (disambiguation)
Richard Brown (disambiguation)
Rick Brown (disambiguation)
Rob Brown (disambiguation)
Robert Brown (disambiguation)
Robin Brown (disambiguation)
Roger Brown (disambiguation)
Ronald Brown (disambiguation)
Ronnie Brown (disambiguation)
Rosemary Brown (disambiguation)
Roy Brown (disambiguation)
Russell Brown (disambiguation)
Ruth Brown (disambiguation)
Ryan Brown (disambiguation)
Sam Brown (disambiguation)
Samuel Brown (disambiguation)
Sandra Brown (disambiguation)
Sandy Brown (disambiguation)
Sarah Brown (disambiguation)
Scott Brown (disambiguation)
Shannon Brown (disambiguation)
Sharon Brown (disambiguation)
Sheldon Brown (disambiguation)
Sidney Brown (disambiguation)
Simon Brown (disambiguation)
Spencer Brown (disambiguation)
Stan Brown (disambiguation)
Stephanie Brown (disambiguation)
Stephen Brown (disambiguation)
Steve Brown (disambiguation)
Susan Brown (disambiguation)
Ted Brown (disambiguation)
Terry Brown (disambiguation)
Thomas Brown (disambiguation)
Timothy Brown (disambiguation)
Tom Brown (disambiguation)
Tommy Brown (disambiguation)
Tony Brown (disambiguation)
Travis Brown (disambiguation)
Troy Brown (disambiguation)
Vernon Brown (disambiguation)
Victor Brown (disambiguation)
Victoria Brown (disambiguation)
Vincent Brown (disambiguation)
Walter Brown (disambiguation)
Warren Brown (disambiguation)
Wayne Brown (disambiguation)
Wendy Brown (disambiguation)
Wesley Brown (disambiguation)
Will Brown (disambiguation)
William Brown (disambiguation)
William Henry Brown (disambiguation)
Willie Brown (disambiguation)
Wilson Brown (disambiguation)
Woody Brown (disambiguation)

See also
Braun (surname)
Brawn (surname)
Browne (surname)

Categories 
Brown family of Rhode Island

Brown
Brown

de:Brown (Familienname)
sl:Brown